Laurenti is a surname. It may refer to:

People
Adolfo Laurenti (1856-1944), Italian sculptor
Camillo Laurenti (1861–1938), Italian cardinal
Cesare Laurenti (engineer), Italian designer of submarines influencing HMS Swordfish (1916)
Cesare Laurenti (painter) (1854–1936), Italian artist
Donato Laurenti (died 1584), Roman Catholic Bishop of Ariano and then Bishop of Minori
Fabien Laurenti (born 1983), French footballer
Josephus Nicolaus Laurenti (1735-1805), Austrian naturalist and zoologist of Italian origin
Lodovico Filippo Laurenti (1693–1757), Italian composer
Josephus Nicolaus Laurenti (1735–1805), Austrian naturalist of Italian origin
Mariano Laurenti (born 1929), Italian film director
Silvio Laurenti Rosa (1892-1965), Italian film director

Fictional character 
Commissario Proteo Laurenti, protagonist in a series of crime novels by Veit Heinichen

Biology 
Aphaenops laurenti, species of beetle in the subfamily Trechinae
Astylosternus laurenti, species of frog in the family Arthroleptidae
Boophis laurenti, species of frog in the family Mantellidae
Chironius laurenti, species of nonvenomous snake in the family Colubridae
Hyperolius laurenti, species of frog in the family Hyperoliidae
Idia laurenti, species of litter moth of the family Erebidae

Other uses 
Champagne Laurenti, champagne producer from Les Riceys/France
Fiat-Laurenti, two classes of Japanese Type L submarine

References

See also
Raymond Laurent (1917–2005), herpetologist, origin of reptile binomial name laurenti

Italian-language surnames
Surnames from given names